T. S. B. K. Moulee (born: March 14, 1947 Thiruvidaimarudur Sambamoorthy Ganapathy Balakrishna Sastrigal Mouli) is an Indian film director, writer, playwright, thespian and actor known for his works in Telugu and Tamil cinema. His celluloid scripts include Kamal Haasan's Pammal K. Sambandam, the biographical sports drama film Ashwini, and Nala Damayanthi in the year 2003.

Three of his popular plays were translated into Telugu and Bengali and were staged in Andhra Pradesh and West Bengal with a record of 4000 stage shows. He received the Kalaimamani Award for "Best Writer" in 1985 and the Nandi Award for five films. He has acted in more than 100 films in Tamil and Telugu. He has done supporting roles in films like Thiruvilayaadal Aarambam, Pirivom Sandhippom, Irumbukkotai Murattu Singam and Kadhal to Kalyanam.

Early life 
Mouli is the son of Harikatha exponent T. S. Balakrishna Sastrigal. Mouli was interested in acting and played parts in stage plays from his school days. As a school-going kid, he was fascinated by the plays of T. K. Shanmugam and Singanallur Venkataramana Iyer Sahasranamam, both noted personalities in producing stage plays at that time.

Although he pursued a BTech degree, he said he "could not resist the temptation to write plays". At 19, he wrote a 45-minute play and staged it at a function organised to felicitate actor Sivaji Ganesan for his Padma Shri award. In his college days, he was a part of Y. G. Parthasarathy's United Artists Association. However, Mouli first came into limelight in 1969 when he wrote the screenplay for and acted in the play "Flight No. 172". The play was a success and ran for thirty continuous years.

He then ventured into film direction despite not having worked as assistant director to anybody. In an interview he said "Actually neither acting nor direction was my goal when I got a chance to venture into cinema. I just wanted to be a writer. But when a producer approached me to make one of my plays into a film and offered me direction too, I took it up". His first feature film was Ivargal Vidhyasamaanavargal, which according to himself, "proved commercially viable" but his second film Matravai Neril, which he got to make, even before his first was completed, was commercially successful. The film made with newcomers, took just 25 days to complete the shoot, and ran for 100 days. He later directed two films under K. Balachander's banner, Anne Anne and Oru Pullanguzhal Adupputhugirathu and wrote the comedy track in Balachander's directorial Nizhal Nijamagiradhu besides acting in it. His film Vaa Indha Pakkam was dubbed in Telugu and introduced Mouli to the Telugu industry. The same producer approached him to do a direct Telugu film. He did not know the language but with the help of popular Telugu writer Jandhyala who translated his script, he made the film Patnam Vachina Pativrathalu with Chiranjeevi and Raadhika. The film was successful, running for 280 days. he made over 20 Telugu films in the next 15 years.

Personal life
Mouli is married and has two children –  a daughter and a son. His daughter Shravanthi is a carnatic singer. He has a brother, S. B. Khanthan who is also a film and creative director.

Selective filmography

As director and writer

As writer

As actor
 Films

As dubbing artist

Television

References

External links 
 

Tamil film directors
Film directors from Chennai
Male actors in Tamil cinema
Tamil dramatists and playwrights
Living people
Screenwriters from Chennai
Indian male dramatists and playwrights
20th-century Indian film directors
20th-century Indian dramatists and playwrights
20th-century Indian male actors
Indian male film actors
21st-century Indian male actors
Screenwriters from Tamil Nadu
Tamil screenwriters
Indian male television actors
Male actors in Telugu cinema
20th-century Indian male writers
1947 births
Telugu film directors